Ichthyapus platyrhynchus is an eel in the family Ophichthidae (worm/snake eels). It was described by William Alonzo Gosline III in 1951. It is a marine, tropical eel which is known from Hawaii, in the eastern Pacific Ocean. It forms burrows in sand sediments.

References

Ophichthidae
Taxa named by William Alonzo Gosline III
Fish described in 1951